1916 United States House of Representatives elections were elections for the United States House of Representatives to elect members to serve in the 65th United States Congress. They were held for the most part on November 7, 1916, while Maine held theirs on September 11. They coincided with the re-election of President Woodrow Wilson.

Wilson eked out a narrow re-election, but his Democratic Party lost seats to the Republican Party. Wilson's hybrid approach, which injected a progressive element into Democratic policies, had proved to be dissatisfying to much of the nation. International affairs also became important in the traditionally non-interventionist United States, as voters attempted to determine which party would be best served to keep the nation from entering The Great War.

Republicans won a plurality of seats in the 1916 election. However, when the 65th Congress convened in April 1917, the Democrats narrowly maintained control of the House, forming an alliance with third-party (Progressive and Socialist) members. Not since the 34th Congress (1855–1857) had the party with the most seats not been part of the ruling government. This Congress is the last example to date of a type of coalition holding power in the House, rather than a single party winning a majority of seats. This was also the last time that no party in the house held an overall majority

Jeannette Rankin, a Republican from Montana, became the first woman ever elected to congress.

Election summaries

The Democrats retained control of the House by forming a coalition with the three Progressive members and the single Socialist member, combining to form a razor-thin majority of 218 Representatives.

Early election date
Maine held its election early, on September 11, 1916. There had previously been multiple states with earlier elections, but between 1914 and 1958, Maine was alone in holding early elections.

Special elections 

There were special elections in 1916 to the 64th United States Congress.

Special elections are sorted by date then district.

|-
! 
| Samuel A. Witherspoon
|  | Democratic
| 1910
|  | Incumbent died November 24, 1915.New member elected January 4, 1916.Democratic hold.
| nowrap |

|-
! 
| William G. Brown Jr.
|  | Democratic
| 1910
|  | Incumbent died March 9, 1916.New member elected May 9, 1916.Republican gain.Successor was later re-elected, see below.
| nowrap | 

|-
! 
| William Stephens
|  | Progressive
| 1910
|  | Incumbent resigned July 22, 1916 to become Lieutenant Governor of California.New member elected November 7, 1916. Progressive hold.Successor was not elected to the next term, see below.
| nowrap |

|-
! 
| James Hay
|  | Democratic
| 1896
|  | Incumbent resigned October 1, 1916 to become Judge of the United States Court of Claims.New member elected November 7, 1916.Democratic hold.Successor was also elected to the next term, see below.
| nowrap |

|}

Alabama 

|-
! 
| Oscar L. Gray
|  | Democratic
| 1914
| Incumbent re-elected.
| nowrap | 

|-
! 
| S. Hubert Dent Jr.
|  | Democratic
| 1908
| Incumbent re-elected.
| nowrap | 

|-
! 
| Henry B. Steagall
|  | Democratic
| 1914
| Incumbent re-elected.
| nowrap | 

|-
! 
| Fred L. Blackmon
|  | Democratic
| 1910
| Incumbent re-elected.
| nowrap | 

|-
! 
| James T. Heflin
|  | Democratic
| 1904 
| Incumbent re-elected.
| nowrap | 

|-
! 
| William B. Oliver
|  | Democratic
| 1914
| Incumbent re-elected.
| nowrap | 

|-
! 
| John L. Burnett
|  | Democratic
| 1898
| Incumbent re-elected.
| nowrap | 

|-
! 
| Edward B. Almon
|  | Democratic
| 1914
| Incumbent re-elected.
| nowrap | 

|-
! 
| George Huddleston
|  | Democratic
| 1914
| Incumbent re-elected.
| nowrap | 

|-
! 
| colspan=3 | None 
|  | New seat.New member elected.Democratic gain.
| nowrap | 

|}

Arizona 

|-
! 
| Carl Hayden
|  | Democratic
| 1911
| Incumbent re-elected.
| nowrap | 

|}

Arkansas 

|-
! 
| Thaddeus H. Caraway
|  | Democratic
| 1912
| Incumbent re-elected.
| nowrap | 

|-
! 
| William A. Oldfield
|  | Democratic
| 1908
| Incumbent re-elected.
| nowrap | 

|-
! 
| John N. Tillman
|  | Democratic
| 1914
| Incumbent re-elected.
| nowrap | 

|-
! 
| Otis Wingo
|  | Democratic
| 1912
| Incumbent re-elected.
| nowrap | 

|-
! 
| Henderson M. Jacoway
|  | Democratic
| 1910
| Incumbent re-elected.
| nowrap | 

|-
! 
| Samuel M. Taylor
|  | Democratic
| 1913 
| Incumbent re-elected.
| nowrap | 

|-
! 
| William S. Goodwin
|  | Democratic
| 1910
| Incumbent re-elected.
| nowrap | 

|}

California

Colorado 

|-
! 
| Benjamin Hilliard
|  | Democratic
| 1914
| Incumbent re-elected.
| nowrap | 

|-
! 
| Charles B. Timberlake
|  | Republican
| 1914
| Incumbent re-elected.
| nowrap | 

|-
! 
| Edward Keating
|  | Democratic
| 1912
| Incumbent re-elected.
| nowrap | 

|-
! 
| Edward T. Taylor
|  | Democratic
| 1908
| Incumbent re-elected.
| nowrap | 

|}

Connecticut

Delaware 

|-
! 
| Thomas W. Miller
|  | Republican
| 1914
|  | Incumbent lost re-election.New member elected.Democratic gain.
| nowrap | 

|}

Florida

Georgia

Idaho 

|-
! rowspan=2 | 
| Robert M. McCracken
|  | Republican
| nowrap | 1914
|  | Incumbent lost renomination.New member elected.Republican hold.
| nowrap rowspan=2 | 

|-
| Addison T. Smith
|  | Republican
| nowrap | 1912
| Incumbent re-elected.

|}

Illinois

Indiana 

|-
! 
| Charles Lieb
|  | Democratic
| 1912
|  | Incumbent retired.New member elected.Democratic hold.
|nowrap | 
|-
! 
| William A. Cullop
|  | Democratic
| 1908
|  | Incumbent lost re-election.New member elected.Republican gain.
|nowrap | 
|-
! 
| William E. Cox
|  | Democratic
| 1906
| Incumbent re-elected.
|nowrap | 
|-
! 
| Lincoln Dixon
|  | Democratic
| 1904
| Incumbent re-elected.
|nowrap | 
|-
! 
| Ralph Wilbur Moss
|  | Democratic
| 1908
|  | Incumbent lost re-election.New member elected.Republican gain.
|nowrap | 
|-
! 
| Finly H. Gray
|  | Democratic
| 1910
|  | Incumbent lost re-election.New member elected.Republican gain.
|nowrap | 
|-
! 
| Merrill Moores
|  | Republican
| 1914
| Incumbent re-elected.
|nowrap | 
|-
! 
| John A. M. Adair
|  | Democratic
| 1906
|  | Incumbent retired to run for Governor of Indiana.New member elected.Republican gain.
|nowrap | 
|-
! 
| Martin A. Morrison
|  | Democratic
| 1908
|  | Incumbent retired.New member elected.Republican gain.
|nowrap | 
|-
! 
| William R. Wood
|  | Republican
| 1914
| Incumbent re-elected.
|nowrap | 
|-
! 
| George W. Rauch
|  | Democratic
| 1906
|  | Incumbent lost re-election.New member elected.Republican gain.
|nowrap | 
|-
! 
| Cyrus Cline
|  | Democratic
| 1908
|  | Incumbent lost re-election.New member elected.Republican gain.
|nowrap | 
|-
! 
| Henry A. Barnhart
|  | Democratic
| 1908
| Incumbent re-elected.
|nowrap | 
|}

Iowa 

|-
! 
| Charles A. Kennedy
|  |Republican
| 1906
| Incumbent re-elected.
| nowrap | 
|-
! 
| Harry E. Hull
|  |Republican
| 1914
| Incumbent re-elected.
| nowrap | 
|-
! 
| Burton E. Sweet
|  |Republican
| 1914
| Incumbent re-elected.
| nowrap | 
|-
! 
| Gilbert N. Haugen
|  |Republican
| 1898
| Incumbent re-elected.
| nowrap | 
|-
! 
| James W. Good
|  |Republican
| 1908
| Incumbent re-elected.
| nowrap | 
|-
! 
| C. William Ramseyer
|  |Republican
| 1914
| Incumbent re-elected.
| nowrap | 
|-
! 
| Cassius C. Dowell
|  |Republican
| 1914
| Incumbent re-elected.
| nowrap | 
|-
! 
| Horace M. Towner
|  |Republican
| 1910
| Incumbent re-elected.
| nowrap | 
|-
! 
| William R. Green
|  |Republican
| 1911
| Incumbent re-elected.
| nowrap | 
|-
! 
| Frank P. Woods
|  |Republican
| 1908
| Incumbent re-elected.
| nowrap | 
|-
! 
| Thomas J. Steele
|  |Democratic
| 1914
|  | Incumbent lost re-election.New member elected.Republican gain.
| nowrap | 
|}

Kansas

Kentucky 

|-
! 
|Alben W. Barkley
| |Democratic
|1912
|Incumbent re-elected.
|
|-
! 
|David H. Kincheloe
| |Democratic
|1914
|Incumbent re-elected.
|
|-
! 
|Robert Y. Thomas Jr.
| |Democratic
|1908
|Incumbent re-elected.
|
|-
! 
|Ben Johnson
| |Democratic
|1906
|Incumbent re-elected.
|
|-
! 
|J. Swagar Sherley
| |Democratic
|1902
|Incumbent re-elected.
|
|-
! 
|Arthur B. Rouse
| |Democratic
|1910
|Incumbent re-elected.
|
|-
! 
|J. Campbell Cantrill
| |Democratic
|1908
|Incumbent re-elected.
|
|-
! 
|Harvey Helm
| |Democratic
|1906
|Incumbent re-elected.
|
|-
! 
|William J. Fields
| |Democratic
|1910
|Incumbent re-elected.
|
|-
! 
|John W. Langley
| |Republican
|1906
|Incumbent re-elected.
|
|-
! 
|Caleb Powers
| |Republican
|1910
|Incumbent re-elected.
|
|}

Louisiana 

|-
! 
|Albert Estopinal
|  |Democratic
|1908
|Incumbent re-elected.
|
|-
! 
|H. Garland Dupré
|  |Democratic
|1910
|Incumbent re-elected.
|
|-
! 
|Whitmell P. Martin
| |Progressive
|1914
|Incumbent re-elected.
|
|-
! 
|John T. Watkins
|  |Democratic
|1904
|Incumbent re-elected.
|
|-
! 
|Riley J. Wilson
|  |Democratic
|1914
|Incumbent re-elected.
|
|-
! 
|Lewis Lovering Morgan
|  |Democratic
|1912
|Incumbent re-elected.
|
|-
! 
|Ladislas Lazaro
|  |Democratic
|1912
|Incumbent re-elected.
|
|-
! 
|James Benjamin Aswell
|  |Democratic
|1912
|Incumbent re-elected.
|
|}

Maine 

|-
! 

|-
! 

|-
! 

|-
! 

|}

Maryland

Massachusetts 

|-
! 
|Allen T. Treadway
|  |Republican
|1912
|Incumbent re-elected.
| nowrap="" |
|-
! 
|Frederick H. Gillett
|  |Republican
|1892
|Incumbent re-elected.
| nowrap="" |
|-
! 
|Calvin DeWitt Paige
|  |Republican
|1914
|Incumbent re-elected.
| nowrap="" |
|-
! 
|Samuel Winslow
|  |Republican
|1912
|Incumbent re-elected.
| nowrap="" |
|-
! 
|John Jacob Rogers
|  |Republican
|1912
|Incumbent re-elected.
| nowrap="" |
|-
! 
|Augustus P. Gardner
|  |Republican
|1902
|Incumbent re-elected.
| nowrap="" |
|-
! 
|Michael Francis Phelan
|  |Democratic
|1912
|Incumbent re-elected.
| nowrap="" |
|-
! 
|Frederick W. Dallinger
|  |Republican
|1914
|Incumbent re-elected.
| nowrap="" |
|-
! 
|Ernest W. Roberts
|  |Republican
|1912
| |Incumbent lost re-election.New member elected.Republican hold.
| nowrap="" |
|-
! 
|Peter Tague
|  |Democratic
|1914
|Incumbent re-elected.
| nowrap="" |
|-
! 
|George H. Tinkham
|  |Republican
|1914
|Incumbent re-elected.
| nowrap="" |
|-
! 
|James A. Gallivan
|  |Democratic
|1914
|Incumbent re-elected.
| nowrap="" |
|-
! 
|William Henry Carter
|  |Republican
|1914
|Incumbent re-elected.
| nowrap="" |
|-
! 
|Richard Olney II
|  |Democratic
|1914
|Incumbent re-elected.
| nowrap="" |
|-
! 
|William S. Greene
|  |Republican
|1898
|Incumbent re-elected.
| nowrap="" |
|-
! 
|Joseph Walsh
|  |Republican
|1914
|Incumbent re-elected.
| nowrap="" |
|}

Michigan 

|-
! 

|-
! 

|-
! 

|-
! 

|-
! 

|-
! 

|-
! 

|-
! 

|-
! 

|-
! 

|-
! 

|-
! 

|-
! 

|}

Minnesota 

|-
! 
| Sydney Anderson
|  | Republican
| 1910
| Incumbent re-elected.
|
|-
! 
| Franklin Ellsworth
|  | Republican
| 1914
| Incumbent re-elected.
|
|-
! 
| Charles Russell Davis
|  | Republican
| 1902
| Incumbent re-elected.
|
|-
! 
| Carl Van Dyke
|  | Democratic
| 1914
| Incumbent re-elected.
|
|-
! 
| George Ross Smith
|  | Republican
| 1912
|  |Incumbent lost renomination.New member elected.Republican hold.
|
|-
! 
| Charles August Lindbergh
|  | Republican
| 1906
|  |Incumbent retired to run for U.S. senator.New member elected.Republican hold.
|
|-
! 
| Andrew Volstead
|  | Republican
| 1902
| Incumbent re-elected.
|
|-
! 
| Clarence B. Miller
|  | Republican
| 1908
| Incumbent re-elected.
|
|-
! 
| Halvor Steenerson
|  | Republican
| 1902
| Incumbent re-elected.
|
|-
! 
| Thomas D. Schall
|  | Progressive
| 1914
|  | Incumbent re-elected then joined Republicans.Republican gain.
|
|}

Mississippi 

|-
! 
| Ezekiel S. Candler Jr.
|  | Democratic
| 1900
| Incumbent re-elected.
| nowrap | 

|-
! 
| Hubert D. Stephens
|  | Democratic
| 1910
| Incumbent re-elected.
| nowrap | 

|-
! 
| Benjamin G. Humphreys II
|  | Democratic
| 1902
| Incumbent re-elected.
| nowrap | 

|-
! 
| Thomas U. Sisson
|  | Democratic
| 1908
| Incumbent re-elected.
| nowrap | 

|-
! 
| William W. Venable
|  | Democratic
| 1916 (special)
| Incumbent re-elected.
| nowrap | 

|-
! 
| Pat Harrison
|  | Democratic
| 1910
| Incumbent re-elected.
| nowrap | 

|-
! 
| Percy Quin
|  | Democratic
| 1912
| Incumbent re-elected.
|  nowrap | 

|-
! 
| James Collier
|  | Democratic
| 1908
| Incumbent re-elected.
| nowrap | 

|}

Missouri 

|-
! 
| James T. Lloyd
|  |Democratic
| 1897 
|  | Incumbent retired.New member elected.Democratic hold.
| nowrap="" |
|-
! 
| William W. Rucker
|  |Democratic
| 1898
| Incumbent re-elected.
| nowrap="" |
|-
! 
| Joshua W. Alexander
|  |Democratic
| 1906
| Incumbent re-elected.
| nowrap="" |
|-
! 
| Charles F. Booher
|  |Democratic
| 1906
| Incumbent re-elected.
| nowrap="" |
|-
! 
| William P. Borland
|  |Democratic
| 1908
| Incumbent re-elected.
| nowrap="" |
|-
! 
| Clement C. Dickinson
|  |Democratic
| 1910 
| Incumbent re-elected.
| nowrap="" |
|-
! 
| Courtney W. Hamlin
|  |Democratic
| 1906
| Incumbent re-elected.
| nowrap="" |
|-
! 
| Dorsey W. Shackleford
|  |Democratic
| 1899 
| Incumbent re-elected.
| nowrap="" |
|-
! 

|-
! 

|-
! 

|-
! 

|-
! 

|-
! 

|-
! 

|-
! 

|}

Montana 

This was the last time Montana used an at-large district until its representation was reduced to one in 1992. This was also the first time a woman was elected to Congress.

Nebraska 

|-
! 
| C. Frank Reavis
|  | Republican
| 1914
| Incumbent re-elected.
| nowrap | 

|-
! 
| Charles O. Lobeck
|  | Democratic
| 1910
| Incumbent re-elected.
| nowrap | 

|-
! 
| Dan V. Stephens
|  | Democratic
| 1911 (special)
| Incumbent re-elected.
| nowrap | 

|-
! 
| Charles H. Sloan
|  | Republican
| 1910
| Incumbent re-elected.
| nowrap | 

|-
! 
| Ashton C. Shallenberger
|  | Democratic
| 1914
| Incumbent re-elected.
| nowrap | 

|-
! 
| Moses Kinkaid
|  | Republican
| 1902
| Incumbent re-elected.
| nowrap | 

|}

Nevada 

|-
! 
| Edwin E. Roberts
| 
| 1910
| Incumbent re-elected.
| nowrap | 

|}

New Hampshire 

|-
! 
| Cyrus A. Sulloway
|  | Republican
| 1914
| Incumbent re-elected.
| nowrap="" |
|-
! 
| Edward Hills Wason
|  | Republican
| 1914
| Incumbent re-elected.
| nowrap="" |
|}

New Jersey 

|-
! 

|-
! 

|-
! 

|-
! 

|-
! 

|-
! 

|-
! 

|-
! 

|-
! 

|-
! 

|-
! 

|-
! 

|}

New Mexico 

|-
! 
| Benigno C. Hernández
|  | Republican
| 1914
| | Incumbent lost re-election.New member elected.Democratic gain.
| nowrap="" |
|}

New York

Hawaii Territory 

|-
! 
| J. Kūhiō Kalanianaʻole
|  | Republican
| 1902
| Incumbent re-elected.
| nowrap | 

|}

Philippines 

|-
! rowspan=2 | 
| colspan=3 | Vacant
|  | Del. Manuel L. Quezón (N) retired October 16, 1916.New member elected.Nacionalista hold.
| rowspan=2 nowrap | 

|-
| Manuel Earnshaw
|  | Nonpartisan
| 1912
|  | Incumbent retired.New member elected.Nonpartisan hold.

|}

See also
 1916 United States elections
 1916 United States presidential election
 1916 United States Senate elections
 64th United States Congress
 65th United States Congress

Notes

References

Bibliography

External links
 Office of the Historian (Office of Art & Archives, Office of the Clerk, U.S. House of Representatives)